Naren Reddy (born 14 December 1994) is an Indian cricketer. He made his List A debut for Andhra in the 2017–18 Vijay Hazare Trophy on 11 February 2018.

References

External links
 

1994 births
Living people
Indian cricketers
Place of birth missing (living people)
Andhra cricketers